Snyder Creek may refer to:

Snyder Creek (Iowa River tributary), a stream in Iowa
Snyder Creek (New York), a stream in New York